Kitaev's House is a building of the historical significance in Pushkin, Saint Petersburg. It was built in 1827, and has since been registered as a cultural heritage object. The building is located on 2/19 Pushkinskaya Street.

History 
The house was built in 1827 by the architect VM Gornostaev for the court footman Yakov Kitaev, the valet of Nicholas I. Kitaev died in 1831, and the house passed to his widow Anna Kitaeva. In the same year, Alexander Pushkin and his wife spent the summer and autumn in the house. Pushkin at this time worked on The Tale of Tsar Saltan graduated from the novel Eugene Onegin, began to write the novel Roslavlev, and also prepared The Story of Belkin for publication.

Among the other owners of the house are: Vera Pryanishnikova, the wife of the real secret counselor (1857), Fedor Ivanovich Pryanishnikov (1866), daughter of the merchant Olga Skryabin (1870). In 1877, the wife of the state councilor Olga Vladimirovna Ivanova bought it from the latter, which she owned until the October Revolution. At her house was rebuilt: the portico on the corner of the house was turned into a glazed gallery, the house was expanded along the facade into two windows on both sides. In 1910, a memorial plaque was placed on the house in memory of Pushkin's residence. Since 1917, the house has housed a holiday home for sisters of mercy, and since 1920, the acclimatization station of the Supreme Council of National Economy was located. Since 1931, the house has been inhabited. In the Great Patriotic War, he was seriously damaged but rebuilt. Since 1958, the house opened a museum "Dacha AS Pushkin", and in 1976, the house was completely transferred to the museum

Architecture 
The house is wooden, with a rounded mezzanine at the corner. Before the restructuring, the corner formed a curved portico, otherwise the balcony of the mezzanine was decorated. During the restoration for the museum, the living room, the dining room and the pantry were restored according to the historical design and memoirs of contemporaries. Later, the boudoir and the bedroom were also restored. The rooms are furnished with furniture of Pushkin's time.

References

Literature

Sources 
 
 

Buildings and structures in Pushkin
Houses completed in 1827
1827 establishments in the Russian Empire
Neoclassical architecture in Russia
Historic house museums in Saint Petersburg
Cultural heritage monuments of federal significance in Saint Petersburg